"My Heart's On Fire" is a song recorded by the Australian synthpop band Machinations. It was released in May 1985 as the second single from the band's second studio album, Big Music. The song peaked at number 27 on the Australian Kent Music Report.

Track listing
 7" Single (K 9672)
 Side A "My Heart's On Fire" - 4:15
 Side B "Spark" - 5:05

 12" Single (X 13169)
 Side A "My Heart's On Fire"  (Extended)  - 10:40
 Side B1 "My Heart's On Fire" (Instrumental)  - 7:11
 Side B2 "Spark" - 5:05

Charts

References 

1985 songs
Machinations (band) songs
1985 singles